was a Japanese warrior and the brother of Satō Tadanobu. Tsugunobu died in the Battle of Yashima, while protecting Minamoto Yoshitsune from an arrow shot of Taira no Noritsune by riding between Yoshitsune and Noritsune. Tsugunobu was buried in Mure, Kagawa, by Taira no Noritsune.

Tsugunobu and his brother Tadanobu "were 'given' to Yoshitsune by Fujiwara no Hidehira when Yoshitsune left Oshu to join Yoritomo".

Tsugunobu is mentioned in Hagakure in the passage about martial valor.

References

People of Heian-period Japan
Japanese military personnel killed in action
1158 births
1185 deaths